The Biggin Hill Invader crash was an accident involving a twin-engined Douglas A-26 Invader  aircraft which crashed during an airshow on 21 September 1980. The pilot and six passengers were killed, prompting the Civil Aviation Authority to introduce rules preventing passengers from being carried during air displays.

Accident
During the Biggin Hill Battle of Britain airshow, the Invader made a fast run along the crowd line at  then attempted to carry out either a barrel-roll or a wing over. When the aircraft was inverted the roll rate increased and it dived into the ground in the valley at the end of the runway. The pilot and the six passengers were killed.

Aircraft
The Douglas A-26 Invader was an American medium bomber built for the United States Army Air Force around 1943. It was sold after the war and was operated from England since the mid 1970s as a warbird in USAAF markings as "322612", with the nickname "Double Trouble”.

References

Aviation accidents and incidents at air shows
1980 in England
1980 disasters in the United Kingdom
Aviation accidents and incidents in 1980
Aviation accidents and incidents in Kent